Knoxville Voice was a populist alternative newspaper in Knoxville, Tennessee. It was published every two weeks and available free of charge in more than 300 locations throughout Knox and Blount counties. The paper debuted on April 20, 2006 and ceased publication on January 8, 2009. The summer 2007 sale of Knoxville alternative weekly Metro Pulse to media conglomerate E.W. Scripps, owner of the daily Knoxville News Sentinel, left the Knoxville Voice as the only major, general-interest independent alternative newspaper in Knoxville until it ceased publication.

Origins and influences 
The Knoxville Voice was originally an African American newspaper, also published in Knoxville and devoted to minority cultural and civil rights issues. The oldest surviving issue (dated November 19, 1949) "focused almost exclusively on national news stories pertinent to African Americans, with a greater emphasis on the work of the NAACP to obtain equal rights, providing a glimpse of the beginnings of the civil rights movement of the 1960s."

The paper continues an editorial tradition of alternative media that extends beyond Knoxville. The spectrum of influences runs from labor-run papers like the British Daily Herald to muckraking newsletters like I.F. Stone's Weekly. Like its local, national, and international predecessors, Knoxville Voice practiced advocacy journalism, covering stories as they affect the public at large and filling gaps in reporting left by mainstream media. With most mainstream media outlets owned by a handful of multinational corporations, polls regularly report that nearly half the U.S. public has little or no "trust and confidence" in the mass media. Knoxville Voice is a reflection of such public attitudes embodied in its reporting and approach to news coverage.

Knoxville Voice published bi-weekly with a focus on local news and cultural events.

Notable editorial features 
Knoxville Voice regularly published opinion-editorial articles from notable local and national commentators, including the award-winning columnist Don Williams, local nuclear nonproliferation activist Ralph Hutchison, and scholar and activist Noam Chomsky. In early 2007, Don Williams left the News Sentinel, the Scripps-owned daily after 20 years and began writing a regular column and online blog for Knoxville Voice.

Knoxville Voice was the only local newspaper to publish an article critical of the controversial summer 2006 deal involving the long-term leasing of the Sunsphere, the iconic Knoxville structure built for the 1982 World's Fair.

Sources

External links 
 Archives of Knoxville Voice web site
 New Millennium Writings journal edited and published by Don Williams
 Oak Ridge Environmental Peace Alliance

Further reading
 Ben H. Bagdikian, The New Media Monopoly (Beacon Press, 2004)
 Edward S. Herman and Noam Chomsky, Manufacturing Consent: The Political Economy of the Mass Media, (Pantheon, 2002)
 Robert W. McChesney, The Problem of the Media: U.S. Communication Politics in the Twenty-First Century (Monthly Review Press, 2004)
 James Curran, The British Press, a Manifesto (MacMillan, 1978)

Defunct newspapers published in Tennessee
Alternative weekly newspapers published in the United States
Mass media in Knoxville, Tennessee
Publications established in 2006
2006 establishments in Tennessee
2009 disestablishments in Tennessee
Publications disestablished in 2009